Vadim Brazovsky (born 1 February 1968) is a Belarusian professional football coach and a former player. Since November 2012, he works as a youth coach in Torpedo-BelAZ Zhodino. In recent years he has been a head coach in Darida Minsk Raion and Torpedo-BelAZ Zhodino in Belarusian Premier League.

References

External links 
 Profile at teams.by

1968 births
Living people
Soviet footballers
Belarusian footballers
Belarusian football managers
FC Torpedo-BelAZ Zhodino players
FC Shakhtyor Soligorsk players
FC Partizan Minsk players
FC Granit Mikashevichi players
FC Torpedo Mogilev players
FC Transmash Mogilev players
Belarusian expatriate footballers
Expatriate footballers in Latvia
FC Darida Minsk Raion managers
FC Torpedo Zhodino managers
Association football defenders